Paul Fromentier (1 March 1914 – 29 October 1981) was a French painter. His work was part of the painting event in the art competition at the 1948 Summer Olympics.

References

1914 births
1981 deaths
20th-century French painters
20th-century French male artists
French male painters
Olympic competitors in art competitions
Artists from Lyon